Bukidnon's 1st congressional district is one of the four congressional districts of the Philippines in the province of Bukidnon. It has been represented in the House of Representatives since 1987. The district encompasses the entire northern frontier of Bukidnon bordering Cagayan de Oro and Misamis Oriental. It consists of the municipalities of Baungon, Libona, Malitbog, Manolo Fortich, Sumilao and Talakag. Prior to redistricting in 2012, the district stretched further south to include the municipalities of Kalilangan and Pangantucan. It is currently represented in the 18th Congress by Maria Lourdes Acosta Alba of the Bukidnon Paglaum Party (BPP).

Representation history

Election results

2019

2016

2013

2010

See also
Legislative districts of Bukidnon

References

Congressional districts of the Philippines
Politics of Bukidnon
1987 establishments in the Philippines
Congressional districts of Northern Mindanao
Constituencies established in 1987